José Esteban Montiel Gómez (born 20 September 1962 in Ogijares, Granada) is a former long-distance athlete from Spain who finished in 32nd position (2:19.15,00) in the Men's Marathon at the 1992 Summer Olympics in Barcelona, Spain.

Achievements
All results regarding marathon, unless stated otherwise

References

1962 births
Living people
Spanish male long-distance runners
Olympic athletes of Spain
Athletes (track and field) at the 1992 Summer Olympics